These are the equivalent Merchant Navy and Royal Navy ranks officially recognised by the British Government in the Second World War.

Naval Auxiliaries were members of the Royal Fleet Auxiliary and crews of Admiralty cable ships or merchant ships or commissioned rescue tugs requisitioned by the Royal Navy and coming under naval discipline.

Footnotes

See also
British Merchant Navy

British Merchant Navy